"Paradise Is Here" is a song written by Paul Brady and first recorded by Tina Turner, for her album Break Every Rule. Brady subsequently released his own version on his 1987 album Primitive Dance, and it has also been covered by Cher for her twenty-first album It's a Man's World.

Tina Turner version
Tina Turner's recording of the track features guitar by Mark Knopfler of Dire Straits (who also produced) and was included on her 1986 album Break Every Rule. It was released as a single in Europe and found minor success in the UK. Instead of a remix, the 12" single featured a seven-and-a-half-minute live version from Turner's 1986/1987 Break Every Rule Tour, on which the track was one of the encores. An edited version of this same recording was later included as the closing track on her 1988 album Tina Live in Europe, omitting most of the closing saxophone solo. The full-length live recording remains unreleased on CD, but is available as part of the music video on Turner's All the Best – The Live Collection DVD.

Music video

The official music video for the song, a live performance piece featuring the same recording as the 12" single, was directed by Andy Morahan.

Charts

Cher version

"Paradise Is Here" was the second North American single by American singer-actress Cher from her studio album, It's a Man's World. It was released on December 3, 1996 by Reprise Records. The song did not crack the US Hot 100, but became a top 20 US club hit, peaking at number eleven. Cher performed the song on The RuPaul Show in 1997.

Track listing
US CD single
"Paradise Is Here" (Single Mix) – 4:05
"Paradise Is Here" (Junior's Arena Anthem) – 10:42
"Paradise Is Here" (Runway Mix) – 8:32
"Paradise Is Here" (Glow Stick Mix) – 8:30
"Paradise Is Here" (Give Me The Night Dub) – 8:30
"Paradise Is Here" (Sunrise Mix) – 6:50
"Paradise Is Here" (Eurodance Mix) – 5:54
"Paradise Is Here" (Garage Revival Mix) – 7:32

US 12" single
"Paradise Is Here" (Junior's Arena Anthem) – 10:45
"Paradise Is Here" (Glow Stick Mix) – 8:33
"Paradise Is Here" (Runway Mix) – 8:32
"Paradise Is Here" (Give Me The Night Dub) – 8:35

Charts

References

1986 songs
1986 singles
1996 singles
Tina Turner songs
Cher songs
Paul Brady songs
Music videos directed by Andy Morahan
Song recordings produced by Mark Knopfler
Song recordings produced by Stephen Lipson
Songs written by Paul Brady
Articles containing video clips